The galactic year, also known as a cosmic year, is the duration of time required for the Sun to orbit once around the center of the Milky Way Galaxy. One galactic year is 230 million Earth years.  The Solar System is traveling at an average speed of 230 km/s (828,000 km/h) or 143 mi/s (514,000 mph) within its trajectory around the galactic center, a speed at which an object could circumnavigate the Earth's equator in 2 minutes and 54 seconds; that speed corresponds to approximately 1/1300 of the speed of light.

The galactic year provides a conveniently usable unit for depicting cosmic and geological time periods together. By contrast, a "billion-year" scale does not allow for useful discrimination between geologic events, and a "million-year" scale requires some rather large numbers.

Timeline of the universe and Earth's history in galactic years

The following list assumes that 1 galactic year is 225 million years.

See also 

 Galactic Tick Day
 Geologic time scale

References

Milky Way
Types of year